Miss International 1991, the 31st Miss International pageant, was held on October 13, 1991 in Tokyo, Japan. Agnieszka Kotlarska earned Poland's first Miss International crown.

Results

Placements

Contestants

  - Verónica Marcela Caldi
  - Melinda Sue Boundy
  - Regina Kozak
  - Stéphanie Dermaux
  - Rosmy Tamara Pol
  - Lisiane Bolsani Braile
  - Helen Upton
  - Robin Elizabeth Nardi
  - Mónica Maria Escobar Freydell
  - Eugenie Jiménez Pacheco
  - Marketa Silna
  - Malene Christensen
  - Melissa Vargas
  - Päivi Hytinkoski
  - Catherine Anne Marie Clarysse
  - Katrin Richter
  - Dimitra Papadogianni
  - Norma Jean Cepeda
  - Gloria Elizabeth Comparini
  - Tamme Strickland
  - Marjanna Kraayenveld
  - Marly Karina Prudoth Guzmán
  - Valerie Chow Ka-Ling
  - Kinga Czuczor
  - Solveig Kristjansdóttir
  - Preeti Mankotia
  - Susan Brady
  - Efrat Bruner
  - Mikaela Monari
  - Miho Takata
  - Kwon Jung-joo
  - Annette Feydt
  - Lilia Cristina Serrano Nájera
  - Valerie Anne Delrieu
  - Nicola Jane Dean
  - Christina Rasa Salas
  - Hege Cathrin Baardsen
  - Jessica Inés Lacayo
  - Maria Luján Oviedo
  - Maria Patricia Betita
  - Agnieszka Kotlarska †
  - Gisela Galhavano
  - Lizaura Quiñones Torres
  - Audrey Siok Ling Tan
  - Elodie Chantal Jordá de Quay
  - Charlotte Victoria Wallden
  - Francesca Centamore
  - Rebecca Herenui Touaitahuata
  - Defne Samyeli
  - Kimberly Anne Byers
  - Niurka Auristela Acevedo

1991
1991 in Tokyo
1991 beauty pageants
Beauty pageants in Japan